DWJJ-TV, channel 44, is a commercial relay television station owned by GMA Network Inc. Its transmitter is located at Mt. Landing, Jalajala, Rizal. This station primarily caters the audiences from the Cavite, Rizal and Laguna.

GMA TV-44 Jalajala programs
Balitang Southern Tagalog

See also
List of GMA Network stations

References

Television stations in Rizal
Television channels and stations established in 2011
GMA Network stations